Edler is a surname. Notable people with the surname include:

Alexander Edler (born 1986), Swedish ice hockey player
Dave Edler (born 1956), American baseball player and mayor
Deke Edler (1897–1953), American football player
Donald K. Edler (1922–1999), American sailor
Hans Edler (born 1945), Swedish pop musician and record company manager
Inge Edler (1911–2001), Swedish cardiologist, medical ultrasonography developer
Jeff Edler (born 1976), American politician
Kurt Edler (1950–2021), German politician

See also
Werner Edler-Muhr (born 1969), Austrian middle-distance runner